Yuen Cheung-yan is a Hong kong actor, director, stuntman, and fight choreographer who has worked for many years in the Hong Kong film industry. During the 1970s and early 1980s, he worked with his elder brother, Yuen Woo-ping, and other members of the Yuen family on several films, some of them kung fu comedies such as Shaolin Drunkard (1983) and The Miracle Fighters (1983).

Filmography

As actor

As director

As fight choreographer

External links
 

Hong Kong male film actors
Hong Kong film directors
Hong Kong kung fu practitioners
Chinese choreographers
Living people
Year of birth missing (living people)
Male actors from Guangdong
Film directors from Guangdong
Male actors from Guangzhou
Action choreographers
Chinese male film actors
Chinese film directors